Yellowstone is a Boeing Commercial Airplanes project to replace its entire civil aircraft portfolio with advanced technology aircraft. New technologies to be introduced include composite aerostructures, more electrical systems (reduction of hydraulic systems), and more fuel-efficient turbofan engines (such as the Pratt & Whitney PW1000G Geared Turbofan, General Electric GEnx, the CFM International CFM56, and the Rolls-Royce Trent 1000). The term "Yellowstone" refers to the technologies, while "Y1" through "Y3" refer to the actual aircraft.

The first of these projects, Y2, has entered service as the Boeing 787.

Yellowstone projects
Yellowstone is divided into three projects:

 Boeing Y1, to replace the Boeing 737, 757, and 767-200 product lines. The Y1 covers the 100- to 250-passenger market, and is expected to be the second Yellowstone Project aircraft to be developed. Boeing submitted a patent application in November 2009, that was released to the public in August 2010, that envisions an elliptical composite fuselage, and likely signals the company's planning for the 737 successor. In early 2011, Boeing outlined plans for a 737 replacement that would arrive in 2020. In August 2011, Boeing announced the 737 MAX, an updated and re-engined version of the 737 NG, rather than progress with Y1 concepts.  In November 2014, it was reported that Boeing plans to develop a new aircraft to replace the 737 in the 2030 time frame. From 2015 onwards, it became clear that Boeing was focusing on a "New Midsize Airplane", a seven-abreast twin-aisle with an elliptical cross-section, expected to be launched in 2019 for entry into service in the mid-2020s. In January 2020, Boeing put these plans on hold and announced a clean-sheet reevaluation of the project.
 Boeing Y2, to replace the 767-300 and -400 product lines. It may also replace the 777-200. It covers the 250- to 350-passenger market, and was the first completed Yellowstone project, coming to fruition as the Boeing 787 Dreamliner. Y2 initially referred to the highly efficient, more conventional, baseline aircraft for the Sonic Cruiser, which was project "Glacier". The Dreamliner competes with the Airbus A330, A340 and later A350 families.
 Boeing Y3, to replace the 777-300 and 747 product lines. Y3 covers the 350–600+ passenger market, and is expected to be the third Yellowstone Project aircraft to be developed. It would compete with the Airbus A380 family as well as the largest model of the A350 family, the A350-1000. In June 2010 it was reported that Emirates, which has the largest fleet of 777s, was in discussions with Boeing about plans to develop a new airliner to replace the 777. The Boeing 777-8X and 777-9X, largely considered the end result of the Y3 program, were launched by Boeing on November 16, 2013 at the Dubai Airshow in the United Arab Emirates, with 259 orders.

See also

 Boeing 7X7 series

References

External links 
March 2001 Newsletter, Richard Aboulafia, March, 2001.
"Future Airliners", Aerospaceweb.org, January 5, 2003. (refers to Yellowstone as the project name for the future Boeing 787)
"Not if... but when", Flight International, July 6, 2005.

Yellowstone